Danijela Simić (born August 21, 1969) is a Serbian rhythmic gymnast. At the age of 14, she represented Yugoslavia at the 1984 Summer Olympics where she finished tenth in the individual all-around.

References 

1969 births
Living people
Serbian rhythmic gymnasts
Yugoslav rhythmic gymnasts
Olympic gymnasts of Yugoslavia
Gymnasts at the 1984 Summer Olympics